The Oxford University Jazz Orchestra (OUJO) is a jazz orchestra based in the University of Oxford, England. It was founded in 1991.

History

The Oxford University Jazz Orchestra was founded by students in the early 1990s, initially as a word-of-mouth, unauditioned group, later developing into a full-fledged, professional standard big band. Notable alumni from the band include Canadian jazz vocalist Diane Nalini, trumpeter and NYJO musical director Mark Armstrong, London-based trombonist Callum Au, saxophonists Carlos Lopez-Real and Idris Rahman, and ENO conductor Stephen Higgins.

OUJO has been a multiple-time winner at the BBC Radio 2 National Big Band Competition, and has performed at the Oeuf de Jazz Festival in Le Mans, the OK! Celebrity Ball in London, and the Bull's Head jazz venue in Barnes, west London.

From 1999 to 2002, the band was led by cardiologist and saxophonist Euan Ashley. During his tenure, the band appeared at the Glasgow International Jazz Festival and performed Kenny Wheeler's Sweet Time Suite at St Barnabas Church, Oxford. In 2002, OUJO recorded the live LP Know Where You Are.

In 2010, OUJO toured New York City, performing at multiple venues including a performance for the Hudson Union Society at the Russian Tea Room and as part of the "After Work" series in Bryant Park.

In 2012, the band toured to Canada, performing at the Toronto Downtown Jazz Festival, supporting the Mingus Big Band on the main stage at the Ottawa International Jazz Festival, and playing at the Montreal International Jazz Festival.
In 2013, OUJO became an official Oxford University Music Society affiliated ensemble.

Associated ensembles
The Oxford University Jazz Orchestra was linked with the Oxford University Big Band (OUBB), another jazz orchestra based in Oxford. The group was based on a band formed in 1961 by NYJO founder Bill Ashton.

Present activity
OUJO performs regularly on the Oxford ball circuit, including at the Commemoration balls, having appeared in line-ups with artists such as The Streets, Sophie Ellis-Bextor, Natty, and Athlete. The band represents Oxford annually in a Varsity "jazzoff" match against the Cambridge University Jazz Orchestra.

In 2015, OUJO performed Duke Ellington's choral composition The Sacred Concerts, in collaboration with Schola Cantorum of Oxford, saxophonist Nigel Hitchcock, and vocalist Tina May, and tap dancer Annette Walker at the Sheldonian Theatre.

See also
 Oxford University Jazz Society

References

External links

 Oxford University Jazz Orchestra website

1991 establishments in England
Big bands
Clubs and societies of the University of Oxford
English jazz ensembles
Musical groups established in 1991
Musical groups from Oxford
University orchestras